The NWA Detroit United States Heavyweight Championship was a version of the NWA United States Heavyweight Championship contested in Big Time Wrestling from 1959 until 1980. It was originally known as the Chicago version and contested on shows produced by Fred Kohler Enterprises. While the National Wrestling Alliance recognized only one World Heavyweight Champion, there were multiple "NWA United States Heavyweight Champion"s, as many NWA-affiliated promotions/"territories" across the U.S. each had its own version of an "American" or "United States" championship. For most such territories -- including Detroit -- the U.S. Title was the promotion's primary singles championship. Over its history, the title was held by stars including Bobo Brazil, The Sheik, Wilbur Snyder, Johnny Valentine, and multi-time AWA World Heavyweight Champions Verne Gagne and Dick the Bruiser.

Michigan wrestling promotion XICW (Xtreme Intense Championship Wrestling) has a U.S. Title used on their shows that is based on the NWA U.S. Title Detroit version in look and design.

Title history

See also

National Wrestling Alliance

References

United States Heavyweight Championship
Fred Kohler Enterprises championships
National Wrestling Alliance championships
NWA United States Heavyweight Championships
Professional wrestling in the Chicago metropolitan area